Afzelia is a genus of plants in family Fabaceae. The thirteen species all are trees, native to tropical Africa or Asia.

The genus name of Afzelia is in honour of Adam Afzelius (1750–1837), a Swedish botanist and an apostle of Carl Linnaeus.

Uses
Afzelia species are used primarily for wood, though some species also have medicinal uses. The timber is most commonly traded under the collective name "doussie", as well as under name "afzelia". One of the common names is also "pod mahogany", adding to the confusion surrounding the name mahogany.

The seeds are red and black and are used as beads.

The wood is often used as the surface material for outdoor velodromes.

The highly figured wood of the Asian species, Afzelia xylocarpa, is sold as Afzelia xylay.  The seeds and bark of this species are used as medicine.

The dense and wavy wood of an Afzelia africana is used in ship-building.

References

External links
ILDIS world database of legumes
Doussie technological characteristics, Tropix program, CIRAD Agricultural Research for Development Countries

 
Fabaceae genera
Wood